is a Japanese manga series written and illustrated by Go Nagai. It is part of the Devilman franchise created by Nagai. The manga ran in Shogakukan's Big Comic from December 2014 to March 2020, with its chapters collected in thirteen tankōbon volumes.

Publication
Devilman Saga is written and illustrated by Go Nagai. It was serialized in Shogakukan's Big Comic from December 25, 2014, to March 10, 2020. Shogakukan collected its chapters in thirteen tankōbon volumes, released from June 30, 2015, to May 29, 2020.

Volume list

References

External links
 

Devilman
Seinen manga
Shogakukan franchises
Shogakukan manga